Günter Schlierkamp (born 2 February 1970) is a German IFBB professional bodybuilder. Schlierkamp was born in Olfen, Nordrhein-Westfalen, Germany, where he grew up on a farm. In 1996 he married Carmen Jourst and moved to the United States, but they divorced in 2003. Four years later, he married American personal trainer Kim Lyons in March 2007.

After a fourth place showing at the 2005 Mr. Olympia contest, Schlierkamp started training with legendary trainer Charles Glass. Schlierkamp had trained with Glass in 2002, and finished above 8-time Mr. Olympia Ronnie Coleman at the GNC Show of Strength. Hoping to gain an edge for the 2006 Mr. Olympia Title by training with Glass, Schlierkamp didn't manage to improve on the previous year's finish and ended in 10th place. In 2006 he had a role in an American movie Beerfest, released by the Broken Lizard comedy group.

Stats 
 Nickname: "The Gentle Giant"
 Official website: www.gunters.net
 Location: Hermosa Beach, California, USA
 Marital status: Divorced Carmen Jourst (2003); Married Kim Lyons (2007)
 Date of birth: February 2, 1970
 Place of birth: Olfen, Germany
 Height: 6 ft 1 1/2 in (1.85 m)(but it is not true...approx. 1.90 m)
 Contest weight: 295-300 lb (133–136 kg)
 Off-season weight: Around 325-330 lb (147–150 kg)

Competitive history
 1990 German Championships - Overall Winner
 1990 German Championships - 1st, Junior Tall
 1992 IFBB European Amateur Championships - 1st, HeavyWeight
 1992 German Championships - 1st, Heavyweight
 1993 IFBB World Amateur Championships - 1st, HeavyWeight
 1994 IFBB Grand Prix England - 8th
 1994 IFBB Grand Prix Germany - 8th
 1994 Mr. Olympia - 19th
 1995 IFBB Canada Pro Cup - 2nd
 1995 IFBB Grand Prix Ukraine - 10th
 1996 Arnold Classic - 11th
 1996 Night of Champions - 11th
 1996 San Jose Pro Invitational - 9th
 1997 IFBB Canada Pro Cup - 6th
 1997 Ironman Pro Invitational - Disqualified
 1997 Night of Champions - 9th
 1997 San Jose Pro Invitational - 11th
 1998 Grand Prix Finland - 6th
 1998 Grand Prix Germany - 6th
 1998 Night of Champions - 10th
 1998 Mr. Olympia - 15th
 1998 San Francisco Pro Invitational - 9th
 1998 Toronto Pro Invitational - 6th
 1999 Arnold Classic - 9th
 1999 Ironman Pro Invitational - 5th
 2000 Ironman Pro Invitational - 4th
 2000 Arnold Classic - 6th
 2000 Joe Weider's World Pro Cup - 6th
 2000 Grand Prix England - 4th
 2000 Mr. Olympia - 12th
 2001 Toronto Pro - 6th
 2001 Night of Champions XXIII - 9th
 2001 Mr. Olympia - 15th
 2001 British Grand Prix - 10th
 2002 Mr. Olympia - 5th
 2002 GNC Show of Strength - 1st
 2003 Mr. Olympia - 5th
 2003 English Grand Prix - 3rd
 2003 Holland Grand Prix - 4th
 2003 GNC Show of Strength - 5th
 2004 Arnold Classic - 4th
 2004 Mr. Olympia - 6th
 2005 Mr. Olympia - 4th
 2006 Mr. Olympia - 10th

See also
 Arnold Classic
 List of male professional bodybuilders
 List of female professional bodybuilders
 Mr. Olympia
 Kim Lyons, his second and current wife, a former trainer on The Biggest Loser
 The International Federation of BodyBuilders, to which both Gunter and Kim belong to.

External links
 Günter's Official Site
 Günter Schlierkamp Bodybuilding Gallery
 Bodybuilders.com - Pro Profiles - Gunter Schlierkamp Pro Bodybuilding Profile.
 
 Günter Schlierkamp Gone Hollywood

German bodybuilders
Professional bodybuilders
Living people
1970 births